Bruce!!! is a 2017 American comedy film directed by Eden Marryshow, starring Marryshow, Mlé Chester, Jason Tottenham, Jade Eshete and Cesa Pledger.

Cast
 Eden Marryshow as Bruce
 Mlé Chester as Keira
 Jason Tottenham as Greg
 Jade Eshete as Kerri
 Cesa Pledger as Meredith
 Jamie Dunn as Gwenn
 Gene Pope as Dad
 Christopher Gabriel Núñez as Trevor
 Brenda Thomas
 Mia Dominy as Meryl
 Sasha Dominy as Michelle
 Jean Goto as Theresa
 Ysmael Reyes as Tyler

Release
The film was released on 15 March 2019.

Reception
Chris Salce of Film Threat rated the film 6.5 stars out of 10 and wrote that it "has its moments where it picks up and is funny, but just when it begins to feel like it’s getting hot, it begins to get cold and drags."

Michael Rechtshaffen of the Los Angeles Times wrote that the film "proves stubbornly irredeemable."

Frank Scheck of The Hollywood Reporter wrote that Bruce "ultimately proves far more grating than endearing", and called the film a "slog to endure".

Nick Schager of Variety wrote that while the film "makes a lot of verbal noise", it "says nothing worth remembering."

References

External links
 
 

American comedy films
2017 comedy films